Sosensky is a town in Kozelsky District of Kaluga Oblast, Russia, located in the southeast of the oblast,  southwest of Kaluga, the administrative center of the oblast, and  from Kozelsk, the administrative center of the district. Population:

History
It was founded in April 1952 as the coal-mining settlement of Tsentralny Kozelskogo stroyupravleniya. On January 27, 1954, it was granted urban-type settlement status and renamed Leninsky; however, for an unknown reason it was renamed Shepelevsky on April 5, 1954, and finally Sosensky on April 10, 1954. It was granted town status in 1991.

Administrative and municipal status
Within the framework of administrative divisions, Sosensky is subordinated to Kozelsky District. As a municipal division, the town of Sosensky, together with three rural localities in Kozelsky District, is incorporated within Kozelsky Municipal District as Sosensky Urban Settlement.

References

Notes

Sources

Cities and towns in Kaluga Oblast